Kevin O'Sullivan may refer to:

Kevin Jer O'Sullivan (born 1948), Irish Gaelic footballer for Adrigole, Beara and Cork
Kevin O'Sullivan (journalist) (born c. 1960), editor of The Irish Times
Kevin O'Sullivan (baseball) (born 1968), American college baseball coach and former player
Kevin O'Sullivan (Gaelic footballer) (born 1984), Irish Gaelic footballer for Ilen Rovers and Cork 
Kevin O'Sullivan (skier), New Zealand Paralympian
Kevin O'Sullivan (hurler) (born 1971), Irish hurler
Kevin O'Sullivan (politician) (born 1953), American politician and non-profit executive

See also
Kevin Sullivan (disambiguation)